The 1939 All-Big Six Conference football team consists of American football players chosen by various organizations for All-Big Six Conference teams for the 1939 college football season.  The selectors for the 1939 season included the Associated Press (AP).

All-Big Six selections

Backs
 Paul Christman, Missouri (AP-1 [QB]) (College Football Hall of Fame)
 Beryl Clark, Oklahoma (AP-1)
 Herman Rohrig, Nebraska (AP-1)
 Robert Seymour, Oklahoma (AP-1)

Ends
 Frank Ivy, Oklahoma (AP-1)
 Don Crumbaker, Kansas State (AP-1)

Tackles
 Bernard Weiner, Kansas State (AP-1)
 Cliff Duggan, Oklahoma (AP-1)

Guards
 Warren Alfson, Nebraska (AP-1)
 Robert Waldorf, Missouri (AP-1)

Centers
 Jack West (AP-1)

Key
AP = Associated Press

See also
1939 College Football All-America Team

References

All-Big Six Conference football team
All-Big Eight Conference football teams